Neil Gourley (born 7 February 1995) is a Scottish middle-distance runner specialising in the 1500 metres. He won the silver medal in the event at the 2023 European Indoor Championships and bronze at the 2015 European Under-23 Championships.

Gourley is the European indoor record holder for the mile and the British indoor record holder for the 1500 m. He is a three-time national champion (1500 m).

Career
Neil Gourley won a bronze medal at the 2015 European Under-23 Championships.

In 2019, he reached the final in front of the home crowd at the European Indoor Championships in Glasgow but was unable to compete in it due an illness.

On 25 February 2023, Gourley broke Josh Kerr's British indoor 1500 m record with a time of 3:32.48 at the World Indoor Tour Final in Birmingham, replacing him at No.8 on the respective world all-time list. His win secured him also overall World Tour victory in the event, after his mile win in Boston and runner-up mile finish in New York (with a European indoor record over the distance) earlier that month.

Achievements

International competitions

1Did not start in the final

Personal bests
 800 metres – 1:44.82 (Pfungstadt 2022)
 800 metres indoor – 1:47.04 (Clemson, SC 2018)
 1000 metres indoor – 2:18.68 (Blacksburg, VA 2021)
 1500 metres – 3:32.93 (Birmingham 2022)
 1500 metres indoor – 3:32.48 (Birmingham 2023) 
 One mile – 3:52.91 (Oslo 2022)
 One mile indoor – 3:49.46 (New York, NY 2023) European record
 3000 metres indoor – 7:48.94 (Fayetteville, AR 2022)
 5000 metres – 14:02.40 (Lewisburg, PA 2016)
 5000 metres indoor – 13:16.24 (Bostona, MA 2022)

Circuit wins and titles
 World Athletics Indoor Tour 1500 m overall winner: 2023
 2023: Boston New Balance Indoor Grand Prix (Mile), Birmingham World Indoor Tour Final (1500m)

National titles
 British Athletics Championships
 1500 metres: 2019
 British Indoor Athletics Championships
 1500 metres: 2019, 2023

References

1995 births
Living people
Sportspeople from Glasgow
Scottish male middle-distance runners
British male middle-distance runners
British Athletics Championships winners
Virginia Tech alumni
Virginia Tech Hokies men's track and field athletes